The Thirty-seventh Oklahoma Legislature was a meeting of the legislative branch of the government of Oklahoma, composed of the Senate and the House of Representatives. It met in Oklahoma City from January 2 to July 2, 1979, from January 8 to June 16, 1980, and from July 7 to 11, 1980, during the term of Governor George Nigh.

The 1980 session was marked by the elimination of the Legislative Council, the Nursing Reform Act and the implementation of teacher testing and professional development.

Lieutenant Governor Spencer Bernard served as the President of the Senate. Gene C. Howard served as the President pro tempore of the Oklahoma Senate and Daniel Draper served as the Speaker of the Oklahoma House of Representatives. Frank Keating served as the leader of the state senate Republican caucus and Neal McCaleb served as the leader of the Republican caucus in the Oklahoma House of Representatives.

Dates of sessions
First regular session: January 2-July 2, 1979
Second regular session: January 8-June 16, 1980
Special session: July 7–11, 1980
Previous: 36th Legislature • Next: 38th Legislature

Party composition

Senate

House of Representatives

Major legislation

Enacted
Education reform - House Bill 1706 in 1980 addressed teacher education, certification and professional development.
Nursing Reform Act
Abolishment of Legislative Council

Leadership

Democratic
In Oklahoma, the lieutenant governor serves as President of the Oklahoma Senate, and presides over the chamber and breaks tie votes. Lieutenant Governor Spencer Bernard served in the role in the 37th Oklahoma Legislature. Gene C. Howard served as President pro tempore of the Oklahoma Senate, who is the Senate leader elected by state senators. Daniel Draper served as the Speaker of the Oklahoma House of Representatives. Mike Murphy served as the Speaker Pro Tempore.

Republican
Frank Keating served as the Republican Minority leader of the Oklahoma Senate.
Representative Neal McCaleb served as the Republican Minority leader of the Oklahoma House of Representatives.

Members

Senate

Table based on 2005 state almanac.

House of Representatives

Table based on government database.

References

Oklahoma legislative sessions
1979 in Oklahoma
1980 in Oklahoma
1979 U.S. legislative sessions
1980 U.S. legislative sessions